Stian Angermund, (born 27 August 1986) is a Norwegian trail runner and mountain runner who won the 2021 Amazing Thailand World Mountain and Trail Running Championships at the 40KM distance,

He has also won the Salomon Golden Trail World Series in 2018 and 2021. Stian Angermund holds the record of the Zegama-Aizkorri trail race. Stian Angermund won two gold medals at the 2016 Skyrunning World Championships held in Lleida (Spain), in the Vertical kilometer and SkyMarathon.

Biography
World Champion in Short Trail Running, November 2022 at the 2021 World Mountain and trail running championships.

In 2017 he won the first edition of the Vertical Kilometer World Circuit. He also won two medals at the Skyrunning European Championships, always in vertical kilometer discipline.

World Cup results

Race wins

Other results
 Hovlandsnuten Opp: 1st 2014
 Stoltzekleiven Opp: 1st 2014
Nuten Opp: 1st 2014

National titles
Mountain running
 Norwegian Mountain Running Championships (NM i motbakkeløp): 1st 2014 and 2016, 2nd 2013 and 2017

References

External links
Stian Angermund profile at EAA

1986 births
Living people
Norwegian sky runners
Norwegian mountain runners
Sportspeople from Bergen
Skyrunning World Championships winners